Lyle Setencich (born June 4, 1945) is a former American football player and coach.

Early years
Born in Reedley, California, Setencich attended Washington Union High School in Fresno in 1963. After graduation in 1963, he played two years of junior college football at the College of the Sequoias in Visalia. Setencich transferred to Fresno State, where he was a two-year letterman and graduated with a degree in biological sciences (and physical education) in 1967. He served in the  Medical Corps in 1972 for one year as a physical therapy specialist with the 828th station hospital in Fresno and held the rank of Specialist 5.

High school coach
Setencich began his coaching career as a high school assistant at alma mater Washington in 1969, then at Mount Diablo  in Concord in the East Bay Area. He was then a head coach at Albany  and San Ramon Valley

College coach
Setencich moved to collegiate coaching in 1980 as the defensive coordinator for the Boise State University Broncos under head coach Jim Criner. He helped lead the Broncos to the Big Sky title and the Division I-AA national championship in his first season and the semifinals in 1981. When Criner departed after the 1982 season for Iowa State Uiversity, Setencich was promoted to  He posted a  record in four seasons; his last in 1986 was the first losing campaign (5–6) for the program 

He resigned following the season and immediately became head coach at Cal Poly in San Luis Obispo, where he led the Division II program to a  mark in seven seasons  Setencich later coached at Pacific (1994) under Chuck Shelton, Arizona State (1995–1996) under Bruce Snyder, and California (1997–2001) under Tom Holmoe. In 2003, he became defensive coordinator at Texas Tech under head coach Mike Leach. During his fifth season, he resigned from that position for personal reasons on September 23, 2007.

Head coaching record

College

References

1945 births
Living people
Arizona State Sun Devils football coaches
Boise State Broncos football coaches
Cal Poly Mustangs football coaches
California Golden Bears football coaches
Fresno State Bulldogs football players
Pacific Tigers football coaches
Texas Tech Red Raiders football coaches
High school football coaches in California
People from Reedley, California
Players of American football from California
Sportspeople from Fresno County, California
College of the Sequoias alumni
United States Army reservists
United States Army soldiers